Victorius may refer to:

 Victorius of Aquitaine who created the "Victorian system" of the Cursus Paschalis
 Piero Vettori, known as Petrus Victorius (1499-1585), an Italian classical scholar known for his publication of Ancient Greek texts
 Victorius (comics), a character in the Marvel Comics Universe
 Saint Victorius, son of Saint Marcellus of Tangier
 Victorius, a LNWR Renown Class locomotive

See also
 Victorious (disambiguation)
 Victory (disambiguation)
 Victor (disambiguation)
 Victoria (disambiguation)
 Victorinus (disambiguation)